The J.G. Evans Barn is a historic barn on Hodgen Road in Black Forest, Colorado. It was built in 1885 by John Evans, an Iowa native who moved to the area in 1884. It is one of the few remaining barns from the early settlement and development period in Black Forest.

The complex is located in the hilly landscape with pine trees and includes the barn building, a windmill with missing blades, and a metallic tank. It is currently disused.

The barn was listed on the National Register of Historic Places in 2004.

See also
National Register of Historic Places listings in El Paso County, Colorado

References

Buildings and structures in El Paso County, Colorado
Barns on the National Register of Historic Places in Colorado
National Register of Historic Places in El Paso County, Colorado
Agricultural buildings and structures on the National Register of Historic Places in Colorado